Ashten Regan (formerly Denham, born Sarah Jane Regan; 8 March 1974) is a Scottish politician who served as Minister for Community Safety from 2018 to 2022. A member of the Scottish National Party (SNP), she has been the Member of the Scottish Parliament (MSP) for Edinburgh Eastern since 2016. On 18 February 2023, Regan announced her candidacy for Leader of the SNP and First Minister of Scotland.

A native of Biggar, Regan moved to Devon, England, and studied international relations at Keele University in Staffordshire. After graduating, she moved to London – working in public relations – and gained a diploma at the London School of Public Relations. She returned to Scotland in 2003. She earned a Master of Science in development management at the Open University and worked in digital marketing. She first got involved in politics when she became head of campaigns and advocacy at the Common Weal, a left-wing pro-Scottish independence think tank. In the campaign for the 2014 Scottish independence referendum, Regan actively campaigned for Yes Scotland and was a member of the Women for Independence's national committee. In the aftermath of the referendum defeat, she joined the SNP and was later selected as a candidate for the Edinburgh Eastern constituency in the 2016 Scottish Parliament election. After a successful campaign, she sat as a backbencher, before being appointed to the Scottish Government in First Minister Nicola Sturgeon's 2018 cabinet reshuffle. Regan resigned in October 2022 in protest against the Gender Recognition Reform Bill, the first SNP minister to resign to vote against government policy since the party entered office in 2007. 

Regan currently sits as a backbencher. Following the announcement of Sturgeon's intention to resign the leadership of the SNP and as First Minister of Scotland, Regan announced her candidacy in the ongoing leadership contest to find a successor.

Early life
Sarah Jane Regan was born in Biggar, South Lanarkshire, on 8 March 1974. Her father, a Catholic, and her mother, a Protestant were from the city of Glasgow, where her mother owned a kilt shop on Sauchiehall Street. Regan attended primary school in Scotland, before moving with her family to North Devon in England aged ten. When she was fifteen years old, Regan changed her birth forename in a deed poll to Ashten, to avoid confusion with another girl in her school who shared the same name.

Regan attended Keele University in England from 1992 to 1995, gaining a Bachelor of Arts in International Relations. She was the first in her family to attend university. She was a writer for Concourse magazine, a student newspaper of the Keele University Students' Union. After graduating she moved to London and earned a diploma in public relations at the London School of Public Relations. 

She briefly lived in Australia. Regan married Robert Denham in 2000, and they had twin boys. They returned to Scotland in 2003.

In 2007, Regan studied Development Management at the Open University, gaining a Master of Science in 2012.

Early career 
After graduating from Keele University, Regan worked as a PR and Marketing Officer at ScottClem for three years. She then went on to work as a Senior Account Executive at Spreckley Partners, before becoming Events Executive in late 2002 for Zinc Management. From December 2002 to August 2003, Regan was an Account Manager for Rocket PR.

In October 2012, after graduating from the OU, she worked remotely in Digital Marketing at Tearfund. Returning to Scotland, Regan became Head of Campaigns and Advocacy at the Common Weal, before her election to Holyrood.

Political career

Early political involvement 
At a dinner party in 2012, Regan was asked by guests for her opinion on the 2014 Scottish independence vote. Her then husband, who was born in England, assumed Regan would vote 'No'; however, after she conducted research she had found herself to be more leaning towards the 'Yes' movement.

Regan joined Women for Independence and was active in the Yes Scotland campaign. In January 2014, she was elected to the national committee for Women for Independence. She recalled being “really passionate about Scotland becoming an independent country – I felt the arguments were really strong and I wanted Scotland to have more democratic choice”. Regan was an events co-ordinator for YES Scottish Borders.

Election to Holyrood 
Following the defeat of the Yes Scotland campaign in the referendum, Regan joined the Scottish National Party. In August 2015, she  was selected as the SNP candidate for the Edinburgh Eastern constituency in the upcoming 2016 Scottish Parliament elections after the incumbent MSP Kenny MacAskill, had announced in June that he would not stand for re-election. She was elected, defeating the Leader of the Scottish Labour Party Kezia Dugdale.

Backbencher 
In June 2016, Regan was appointed as Parliamentary Liaison Officer to the Cabinet Secretary for Culture, Tourism and External Affairs. She was a member of the Economy, Jobs and Fair Work Committee and the Finance and Constitution Committee. In November 2017, she was moved from the Economy, Jobs and Fair Work committee to the Health and Sport Committee, where she was appointed deputy convener.

Community safety minister (2018–2022) 
On 27 June 2018, First Minister Nicola Sturgeon announced that she would perform a cabinet reshuffle of her second government. Sturgeon appointed Regan as the Minister for Community Safety, succeeding Annabelle Ewing.

In April 2019, Regan was one of 15 SNP politicians who signed a public letter calling on the Scottish government to delay reform to the Gender Recognition Act, which would make it easier for transgender people to legally change their gender. Later that month, an exchange between Regan and fellow SNP MSPs Gillian Martin and Ruth Maguire was leaked. In it, they expressed frustration at Nicola Sturgeon and claimed she was out of step with the SNP group.

In June 2019, it was reported that a number of her ex-employees received pay-offs worth thousands of pounds and some signed non-disclosure agreements.

In the 2021 Scottish elections, Regan was re-elected, this time increasing her vote share by more than 8,000. Sturgeon reappointed Regan as community safety minister in the third Sturgeon government.

On 27 October 2022 Regan resigned, citing concerns over the Scottish Government's support for the Gender Recognition Reform Bill. Elena Whitham succeeded her as Minister for Community Safety in November, subject to parliamentary approval.

2023 SNP leadership election 

On 18 February 2023, Regan declared her candidacy in the 2023 SNP leadership election, following the resignation of Nicola Sturgeon.

Regan said she would not introduce laws that would "[make] things more difficult for businesses" or "interfere with family life".

Political views

Social
She said she would abandon the Gender Recognition Reform Bill. She said she would seek to introduce new laws to ensure all transgender prisoners go to prisons in accordance with biological sex rather than gender identity. She suggested "a trans wing on the prison estate".

Independence
On independence, Regan said that instead of Sturgeon's proposal to use the next Scottish Parliament or House of Commons election as a de facto referendum on Scottish independence, she would begin negotiations with the UK government on independence the next time political parties supporting Scottish independence received more than half of the vote collectively in an election to either parliament. She said she would establish a constitutional convention with other political parties and organisations that support Scottish independence.

Environment
Regan said she wanted to slow down plans to achieve net zero carbon emissions by phasing out extraction of oil and natural gas from the North Sea. She also committed to prioritising upgrading roads, including converting the A9 road to a dual carriageway faster than planned.

References

External links
 
 profile at SNP website

1974 births
Living people
Alumni of Keele University
Alumni of the Open University
Ministers of the Scottish Government
Female members of the Scottish Parliament
Members of the Scottish Parliament 2016–2021
Members of the Scottish Parliament 2021–2026
Members of the Scottish Parliament for Edinburgh constituencies
Scottish National Party MSPs
Politicians from Glasgow